The big-eyed cardinalfish or bigeye cardinalfish (Epigonus lenimen) is a species of deepwater cardinalfish found in the southern Indian Ocean and southwestern Pacific Ocean from south of Madagascar to New Zealand. This species can reach  in total length.

References
Tony Ayling & Geoffrey Cox, Collins Guide to the Sea Fishes of New Zealand,  (William Collins Publishers Ltd, Auckland, New Zealand 1982) 

Epigonidae
Fish described in 1935